The 1938 FA Charity Shield was the 25th Charity Shield, an annual English football match played between the winners of the previous season's Football League and FA Cup competitions. The match, held at Highbury on 26 September 1938, was contested by Arsenal, champions of the 1937–38 Football League and Preston North End, who beat Huddersfield Town in the final of the 1937–38 FA Cup. Arsenal won the match 2–1, both of their goals scored by Ted Drake. The competition would not be held again until 1948, due to the Second World War.

Background
The FA Charity Shield was founded in 1908 as a successor to the Sheriff of London Charity Shield. It was a contest between the respective champions of the Football League and Southern League, and then by 1913 teams of amateur and professional players. In 1921, it was played by the Football League champions and FA Cup winners for the first time.

Match

Details

Source:

References

FA Community Shield
Charity Shield
Charity Shield 1948
Charity Shield 1948
FA Charity Shield
FA Charity Shield